Luis Alberto Barbat Hudema (born June 17, 1968) is an Uruguayan football goalkeeper.

Club career
1997 - Barbat arrives to Deportes Tolima. His team classifies to Conmebol Cup. Barbat scores 2 penalty kick goals against Deportivo Cali.
2001 - Barbat was key figure for América de Cali, to obtain 11th professional title for this team.

International career
Barbat played for Uruguay's national team at Copa America 2004, after an injury suffered by Goalkeeper Fabian Carini. Uruguay finished 3rd after beating Colombia 2-1.
Barbat was called by Juan Ramón Carrasco to be part of Uruguay national football team during the 2006 FIFA World Cup qualifying campaign. 
He made his debut in a friendly match against Brazil (1-0 win) on April 30, 1992 in the Estadio Centenario in Montevideo under coach Luis Alberto Cubilla.

References

External links
   Fichas Selección Uruguay
   Atlético Bucaramanga

1968 births
Living people
Footballers from Montevideo
Uruguayan people of Catalan descent
Uruguayan footballers
Uruguayan expatriate footballers
C.A. Progreso players
Liverpool F.C. (Montevideo) players
Danubio F.C. players
Central Español players
Juventud de Las Piedras players
América de Cali footballers
Independiente Medellín footballers
Estudiantes de La Plata footballers
Uruguayan Primera División players
Chilean Primera División players
Categoría Primera A players
Expatriate footballers in Argentina
Expatriate footballers in Chile
Expatriate footballers in Colombia
Colo-Colo footballers
1991 Copa América players
2004 Copa América players
Uruguay international footballers
Atlético Bucaramanga footballers
Deportes Tolima footballers
Association football goalkeepers